Anna Margaret Collins (born June 12, 1996) is an American singer-songwriter and actress. She is best known for her work on the soundtrack of the Disney Channel Original Movie, Starstruck.

Early life
Anna Margaret Collins was born in Lecompte, Louisiana but moved to, and was raised in, Alexandria, Louisiana. Her family consists of mother Amy Collins, father, sister Ellie, and brother, Grant. Since she was six years old, she has performed at talent shows and taken vocal lessons. Her family drove on weekends to New Orleans for auditions and acting classes, hoping she would land a part that would include singing. She also transferred from attending private school to being home-schooled and attended Alexandria Senior High in Alexandria, Louisiana.

Discography

Singles

Music videos

Filmography

References

External links

1996 births
Living people
American child singers
Actresses from Louisiana
American child actresses
American female models
Hollywood Records artists
People from Lecompte, Louisiana
Walt Disney Records artists
21st-century American singers
21st-century American women singers